Michael Dennis Antonovich (born August 12, 1939) is an American politician who was Mayor of Los Angeles County and a member of the Los Angeles County Board of Supervisors. He represented the Fifth District, which covers northern Los Angeles County, including the Antelope Valley, Santa Clarita, Pasadena, and parts of the San Fernando and San Gabriel valleys.

Education and early career
Antonovich was born in Los Angeles, California, and attended Thomas Alva Edison Junior High, where one of his classmates was Henry Waxman. He graduated from John Marshall High School and enlisted in the United States Army Reserve in 1957. A member of Sigma Nu fraternity, Antonovich graduated from California State University, Los Angeles in 1963 with a bachelor's degree and a master's degree in 1966. Antonovich taught in the Los Angeles Unified School District and later at Pepperdine University.

Political career
In 1969, Antonovich was elected to the newly formed Los Angeles Community College District Board of Trustees.

In 1972, he was elected to the California State Assembly and for three terms represented Glendale, Burbank, Sunland, Tujunga, Atwater, Griffith Park, Lakeview Terrace and Sun Valley. He served as a Republican whip in the Assembly from 1976 to 1978.

Antonovich ran unsuccessfully for the Republican nomination for Lieutenant Governor of California in 1978 against Mike Curb. After Curb defeated him in the primary, Antonovich declined to specifically endorse Curb in the general election, but instead endorsed the entire Republican ticket. Curb defeated incumbent Mervyn Dymally in the general election.

In 1984 Antonovich was elected chairman of the California Republican Party and served for two years.

He was Chairman of the Board of Supervisors (to which he was first elected in 1980) in 1983, 1987 and 1991 and as the so-called "Mayor of Los Angeles County" in 1983, 1987, 1991, 2001 and 2006.

He ran for the U.S. Senate in 1986 in a three-way primary. Antonovich received the endorsement of television evangelist Pat Robertson. He and Bruce Herschensohn were unsuccessful, and Ed Zschau went on to lose to the incumbent, Alan Cranston. Antonovich lost the San Fernando Valley to Herschensohn.

From 2007 to 2013, Antonovich received $1,862,796.59 in campaign contributions, reported by Los Angeles Registrar-Recorder/County Clerk records.

Antonovich served nine four-year terms on the Board of Supervisors and served until 2016, when a limit of three consecutive terms imposed by voters in 2002 forced him to leave office. That year, Antonovich ran for California State Senator for the 25th District, which includes the cities of Burbank, Glendale, Pasadena, La Canada Flintridge, South Pasadena, Monrovia, Bradbury, Duarte, Glendora, San Dimas, La Verne, Claremont, Upland, Sierra Madre, the unincorporated communities of Altadena, East Pasadena, and La Crescenta-Montrose, and the Los Angeles neighborhoods of Atwater Village and Sunland-Tujunga. He lost to Democrat Anthony Portantino, 57 percent to 43 percent.

Michael D. Antonovich Trail near San Dimas, California, and Michael D. Antonovich Regional Park at Joughin Ranch in the Santa Susana Mountains are named after him.

California bullet train
Antonovich played an important role in shaping the route that California's proposed bullet train project would take. Engineers had determined in a 1999 report that the preferred route for a bullet train between Los Angeles and San Francisco would be the most direct through the Tejon Pass. However, Antonovich argued that the train should be diverted through the Mojave Desert communities of Lancaster and Palmdale in his district, which was estimated to increase the cost of the project by 16%. Critics described the change as political horse-trading that raised the cost and complexity of the project and sacrificed travel time. In a 2022 report, the New York Times linked the maneuver to a connection between Antonovich and real estate developer Jerry Epstein.

Chemerinsky appointment
Antonovich objected to the appointment of Duke University professor Erwin Chemerinsky to be dean of the new law school at the University of California, Irvine, and lobbied against it. The university rescinded the appointment, then later restored it.

Personal life
Antonovich is of Croatian descent.

On February 15, 1998, he married Christine Hu Huiling, a Mandarin-speaking actress from Dalian, China, before 900 guests; Red Buttons and Pat Boone were lay lectors. Hu has two children with Antonovich: a son, Michael Jr., born in 1999, and a daughter, Mary Christine, born in 2000. In 2017, Antonovich learned through an Ancestry.com DNA test that he had fathered a son, Dwight Manley, who was born in 1965 and placed for adoption.

References

External links

Los Angeles County Board of Supervisors: official Supervisor Antonovich — District 5 website
Metropolitan News-Enterprise: Antonovich profile

 

 

Los Angeles County Board of Supervisors
Republican Party members of the California State Assembly
California Republican Party chairs
California State University, Los Angeles alumni
American people of Croatian descent
Politicians from Los Angeles
Antelope Valley
San Fernando Valley
1939 births
Living people